The Klimov TV3-117 is a Russian gas turbine aero engine.  It is used in most medium lift, utility, and attack helicopters designed by the Mil and Kamov design bureaus.  The TV3-117 turboshaft engine was developed in 1974. Later the Klimov TV3-117 was installed on 95% of all helicopters designed by Mil and Kamov Engineering Centre. The engine has been produced in many variants.

Variants
TV3-117 for Mi-24A (1972)
TV3-117M ("M" stands for "marine") – for Mi-14 helicopters incorporates special features to be used at sea. Mass production started in 1976
TV3-117MT ("MT" stands for "modernized, transport") – for Mi-8MT/Mi-17 helicopters and their variants. Mass production started in 1977
TV3-117KM ("KM" stands for "Kamov, marine") – for Ka-27 helicopters
TV3-117V ("V" stands for "high altitude") – for Mi-24 helicopters operated in the mountains (particularly in Afghanistan). Mass production started in 1980
TV3-117VK ("VK" stands for "high altitude, Kamov") – a model similar to the TV3-117V engine but adapted to Ka-27, Ka-29 and Ka-32 helicopters. Mass production began in 1985. Export helicopter models were equipped with TV3-117VKR engines featuring a higher rated and cruising power ("VKR" stands for "high altitude, Kamov, power"); they were originally designed for Ka-28 machines
TV3-117VM ("VM" stands for "high altitude, modernized") – for Mi-28 helicopters and later installed also on Mi-8MT/Mi-17 models. This engine features an automatic switch to emergency power. It was awarded type certificates by the IAC Aviation Registry, India, the Republic of China and the People's Republic of China. Mass-produced since 1986
TV3-117VMA ("VMA" stands for "high altitude, modernized, model A") – for Ka-50 helicopters. It is currently installed on Ka-27, Ka-29, Ka-31, Mi-24, Mi-28A/N and Ka-32 machines. This engine was awarded type certificates by the IAC Aviation Registry and by Transport Canada.  Mass production started in 1986.  Export models are equipped with TV3-117VMAR engines (the extra "R" stands for "power") whose rated power and cruising power are similar to those of the TV3-117VKR engine
TV3-117VM Series 02 – a version of TV3-117VM for Mi-8MT/Mi-17 civil helicopters. Type certificates for this engine were awarded by the IAC Aviation Register, India, the Republic of China and the People's Republic of China. Mass production started in 1993
TV3-117VMA series 02 – a version of TV3-117VMA for Ka-32 civil helicopters. Type certificates for this engine were awarded by the IAC Aviation Register, Transport Canada and Switzerland. Mass production started in 1993
TV3-117VMA-SBM1 a 2000 hp Turboprop version for An-140 aircraft produced by the Antonov Company
VK-2500highly modified TV3-117 2700 hp also for hot and high.

Applications
 Antonov An-140
 Kamov Ka-27
 Kamov Ka-29
 Kamov Ka-32
 Kamov Ka-50
 Mil Mi-8
 Mil Mi-14
 Mil Mi-17
 Mil Mi-24
 Mil Mi-28
 Mil Mi-35

Specifications (TV3-117VMA Series 2)

See also

References

 Taylor, Michael J. H. Brassey's World Aircraft & Systems Directory 1999/2000. London:Brassey's, 1999. .

External links

 Klimov TV3-117 

1970s turboshaft engines
TV-3